Xbox Game Pass and PC Game Pass are video game subscription services from Microsoft. Both services grant users access to a rotating catalog of games from a range of publishers and other premium services, including Xbox Live Gold and EA Play, for a single monthly subscription price. Xbox Game Pass provides this service on Xbox Series X/S and Xbox One consoles, as well as Android, iOS, and iPadOS devices via Xbox Cloud Gaming, selected Samsung TVs via Xbox Cloud Gaming, while PC Game Pass provides the service to personal computers using Windows 11 and Windows 10 with support for Xbox Cloud Gaming. The service was launched on June 1, 2017, while Xbox Live Gold subscribers received priority access on May 24.

History 
Conception of what would become Game Pass came from two areas. First was with Phil Spencer taking over for Don Mattrick as the head of the Xbox brand at Microsoft following the troubled launch of the Xbox One in 2013. Mattrick had positioned the Xbox One as more of an entertainment hub and not a gaming console, and certain design decisions made prior to launch had to be reverted following negative criticism of this positioning from consumers and the media. Spencer, after taking over the Xbox brand, recognized he needed to put the Xbox in a better position as they planned for the next generation of the console, while reinvigorating the team he had with new ideas for this, even if his ideas were risky. One of the ideas generated during this time was a game rental service, and a project to establish this service was started under the code name Arches. As Microsoft progressed, online streaming services like Netflix and Spotify demonstrated successful subscription business models that led Microsoft to transition Arches to also follow a subscription model eventually into Game Pass. The concept of Game Pass fit into the larger corporate strategy of Microsoft to push cloud-based services under CEO Satya Nadella.

The second area involved Rare, a game developer that Microsoft had acquired in 2002. During Mattrick's period at Xbox, he had positioned the Kinect motion-sensing peripheral (introduced with the Xbox 360) as a major component of the Xbox environment, and assigned Rare to work on Kinect Sports as a launch title for it, atypical of Rare's typical output. According to Rare studio director Craig Duncan, working on Kinect Sports gave them creative ideas for a future game with multiplayer elements, which they initially called "Rare Next" but eventually developed into Sea of Thieves. Sea of Thieves was intended as a major test of demonstrating how well Game Pass would be adopted by players and the economics of the system. Spencer knew there was strong hesitation from other game publishers and developers on the subscription model, so he made plans to have Game Pass launch using a catalog of older titles, and then bring on Sea of Thieves as Microsoft's first first-party game for the service, on the same day that it would also be available at retail or purchasable through digital storefronts. Spencer had told Duncan that even if every player of Sea of Thieves played it through Game Pass and that no retail or downloadable copies were bought, Spencer would still consider that a successful result.

On February 28, 2017, Microsoft announced the debut of Xbox Game Pass and made a limited catalog of games available to select members of its Xbox Insider community for testing and feedback. Later in the second quarter of 2017, the service was opened up to players who subscribe to Xbox Live Gold, and then to the general user population. An Xbox Live Gold subscription is not required for Xbox Game Pass, but it is required for any online multiplayer content the games in the catalog may contain.

As part of Microsoft's E3 2017 press conference, Microsoft announced that selected Xbox titles would be made available through a new backwards-compatibility feature similar to that in place for Xbox 360 titles. In a later interview, Spencer stated that some of those games could make their way onto Game Pass, as well.

On January 23, 2018, Microsoft announced an expansion of Game Pass that would see first-party titles arrive on the catalog day-and-date with the retail release of the game, starting with the aforementioned Sea of Thieves launched on March 20, 2018. Crackdown 3, State of Decay 2 and Forza Horizon 4 would also be added upon launch, although their launch dates were not announced at the time, and future releases in existing Microsoft franchises, such as Halo and Gears of War, would also be added upon their release. Additionally, select ID@Xbox titles are also added to the service on their release dates, the first being Robocraft Infinity.

Spencer has stated that Microsoft's intent with the Xbox Game Pass is to make it available across many devices, including those of their competitors. Spencer stated "We want to bring Game Pass to any device that somebody wants to play on...Not just because it’s our business, but really because the business model allows for people to consume and find games that they wouldn’t have played in any other space." Microsoft announced in May 2019 that Xbox Game Pass would be coming for Windows 10 computers, bringing over 100 games from Microsoft's own studios as well as third-parties when it launches.

On April 18, 2019, Microsoft announced Xbox Game Pass Ultimate, a new tier that combines both Game Pass and Xbox Live Gold into a single subscription package. It became available for testing to Xbox Insiders that same day, while general availability began on June 9, 2019. On June 9, 2019, Microsoft announced that Game Pass for PC would launch in open beta, and this would also be included in Ultimate.

xCloud was included for Xbox Game Pass Ultimate subscribers on September 15, 2020, which adds the ability for cloud gaming to select Android mobile devices, with initially over 100 games optimized for the services. Support for additional Android mobile devices are expected later. xCloud support for iOS devices via Safari and via desktop browsers on Windows and macOS computers, was added in beta form in early 2021 and fully released to all Game Pass Ultimate subscribers by June 28, 2021.

Microsoft partnered with Electronic Arts (EA) in September 2020 to bring the basic EA Play service to Xbox Game Pass subscribers on Xbox and PC, with EA Play being made available on console and xCloud to Game Pass Ultimate members on November 10, 2020 (the same day as the launch of the Xbox Series X and Series S), before expanding to PC for Game Pass Ultimate and Game Pass for PC members on March 18, 2021. Spencer said in October 2020 that their current pricing model for Game Pass at this point was considered "completely sustainable" despite concerns from some developers that they were undercharging for it, and that Microsoft had no plans to raise the price in the near future.

In June 2021, Microsoft stated that it was working on a Game Pass app for smart TVs, as well as a "standalone streaming device". Both of these offerings would be built around xCloud. In December 2021, Microsoft announced the rebranding of Xbox Game Pass for PC as "PC Game Pass" to reduce market confusion. The service continues to be branded with the Xbox logo.

On January 18, 2022, Microsoft announced that Game Pass had surpassed 25 million subscribers. On that same day, Microsoft announced plans to acquire Activision Blizzard and to begin integrating Activision's catalog of games into Game Pass.

Riot Games, which has traditionally offered its games through its own launcher, announced in June 2022 that they will be adding their free-to-play games including League of Legends to Xbox Game Pass later in 2022. For games like League of Legends, the full roster of champions or heroes will be available to Game Pass subscribers, while for other titles like Legends of Runeterra, subscribers to Game Pass will receive in-game rewards.

A Friends and Family tier was revealed in September 2022, with trials first released in Ireland and Colombia. The higher priced plan, estimated to be $25/month, allows one to share their account with up to four others, limited to those within the same country as the account holder.

Structure 
Xbox Game Pass is similar to Xbox One's existing EA Play video game subscription and to the PlayStation Now service offered by rival Sony. The subscription catalog contained more than 100 games at launch, with games being added to, and sometimes withdrawn from, the catalog from time to time. Xbox Game Pass allows the player to download the full game to the console; according to Head of Xbox Phil Spencer, this was done to give players "continuous, full-fidelity gameplay without having to worry about streaming, bandwidth or connectivity issues". Unlike EA Access, Xbox Game Pass offers games from a wide range of publishers, such as Bandai Namco, Capcom, WB Games, 2K Games, and first-party games from Xbox Game Studios. According to Spencer, Microsoft sees the Game Pass as more of a platform to offer games that do not fit the common mold that sell well and would be difficult to gain a publisher, and instead to allow these games to be offered in the subscription model, encouraging both developers to create new and experimental titles. The Game Pass also provides a way for players to try games they would not normally have purchased.

The catalog features select games for Xbox Series X|S and Xbox One as well as select Xbox 360 and Xbox titles with which Xbox Series X|S and Xbox One are backwards-compatible. There is no limit to the number of games a player can download and install to their consoles, other than the amount of storage space available to the console. As long as a game remains in the catalog, it is available for unlimited download and play by subscribers. Players can purchase games in the catalog at a 20% discount, and any related add-on content for those games at a 10% discount. The discounted price is available only while the game is in the catalog and is only for the particular game. Games from the catalog can be played while the console is offline, but for no more than 30 days before it must reconnect to verify an active subscription.

If the game is removed from the catalog or the player ends their subscription, access is suspended until the player purchases the game or renews their subscription, but their in-game progress will be saved in the interim. If the game is an Xbox 360 title, it will be backward-compatible and must be used on Xbox Series X|S or Xbox One; it cannot be downloaded to a player's Xbox 360 console unless the player chooses to purchase it.

Spencer has stated that Microsoft has multiple ways to compensate developers for games on Game Pass and there is no one single payback approach. The payback scheme ranges from a flat rate approach as to assure exclusivity on the Microsoft platform, to completely covering the costs of development, and includes various models based on usage and monetization approaches. Paradox Interactive's Fredrik Wester stated the terms they have had followed the Netflix model where the developer or publisher was paid a lump sum by Microsoft for their game on the service for a fixed period of time based on a perceived value, rather than the per-play royalty-based approach used by services like Spotify. The upfront approach, along with the large subscriber numbers, allows developers to select ongoing directions for their games. In the case of Obsidian Entertainment, they were able to consider additional downloadable content for their game Outer Worlds as they knew millions were playing it.

In a July 2020 interview, Xbox's marketing director Aaron Greenberg said that Xbox Game Pass is not necessarily meant to be profitable for Microsoft at the current time but is designed to help draw more players to use it through word-of-mouth by offering a large set of features as a seemingly under priced value, and in the long-term become valuable. This allows them to avoid high costs of advertising the service. As part of a published report as part of Microsoft's proposed acquisition of Activision-Blizzard in 2022, the UK's Competition and Markets Authority reported that Game Pass did cannibalize sales of games for around the first year they are present on the service. Spencer acknowledged the report, but stated the "you instantly have more players of the game, which is actually leading to more sales of the game".

While there had been rumors that Microsoft was working to bring Xbox Game Pass to other console platforms like the PlayStation or Nintendo Switch, Spencer said in an August 2021 interview that there are currently no plans for these consoles. Spencer said "We have no plans to bring [the full Xbox experience] to any other kind of closed platforms right now, mainly because those closed platforms don't want something like Game Pass" and that their focus was on making it available to open systems like personal computers and web applications.

Subscribers 
In the Q3 2020 earnings call in April 2020, Microsoft reported that there were over 10 million Xbox Game Pass subscribers. By September 2020, it had reached 15 million subscribers, 18 million by January 2021, and greater than 25 million by  January 2022.

Availability 

Xbox Game Pass is available in Argentina, Australia, Austria, Belgium, Brazil, Canada, Chile, Colombia, Czech Republic, Denmark, Finland, France, Germany, Greece, Hong Kong, Hungary, India, Ireland, Israel, Italy, Japan, Mexico, the Netherlands, New Zealand, Norway, Poland, Portugal, Russia, Saudi Arabia, Singapore, Slovakia, South Africa, South Korea, Spain, Sweden, Switzerland, Taiwan, Turkey, the United Arab Emirates, the United Kingdom, Ukraine, the United States, and Egypt.

On March 29, 2022, the PC Game Pass Preview launched in five Southeast Asian countries, including Indonesia, Malaysia, Philippines, Thailand, and Vietnam. The service has been officially launched in these countries on April 21, 2022.

The PC Game Pass service has also expanded to several European, North Africa, and Middle East countries through a preview that started on February 28, 2023.

See also 

 Apple Arcade
 Google Play Pass
 GameClub

Notes

References

External links 
 

Computer-related introductions in 2017
Online video game services
Xbox One
Subscription video game services